Dawes Road or the A3219 is a street in Fulham, London.

It runs roughly west to east from Munster Road to North End Road.

The Doll's Hospital at no 16 was a toy shop and the scene of a triple murder in 1948.

References

Fulham
Streets in the London Borough of Hammersmith and Fulham